The Lower Millecoquins River is a  river on the Upper Peninsula of Michigan in the United States. It begins at the outlet of Millecoquins Lake and flows in a winding course south to Lake Michigan. The principal inflow of Millecoquins Lake is the Upper Millecoquins River.

See also
List of rivers of Michigan

References

Michigan  Streamflow Data from the USGS

Rivers of Michigan
Tributaries of Lake Michigan